The 2008–09 Irish Cup was the 129th edition of Northern Ireland's premier football knock-out cup competition. The competition began on 25 October 2008 with the first round and ended on 9 May 2009 with the final.

Linfield were the defending champions, winning their third consecutive Irish Cup the previous season after a 2–1 win over Coleraine in the 2008 final. This season they reached the semi-finals, but were defeated by Cliftonville. Crusaders went on to lift the trophy, beating Cliftonville 1–0 in the final. In doing so, they earned a place in the second qualifying round of the 2009–10 UEFA Europa League.

Results

First round
The matches were played on 25 October and 1 November 2008.

|}

Second round
The games were played on 22 November 2008.

|}

Third round
In this round entered winners from the Second Round as well as all 17 teams from IFA Championship. The games were played on 13 December 2008.

|}

Fourth round
In this round entered winners from the Third Round as well as all 12 teams from IFA Premiership. The games were played on 17 January 2009.

|}

Replays

|}

Fifth round
In this round entered the sixteen winners from the Fourth Round. The matches were played on 14 February 2009.

|}

Quarter-finals

Semi-finals

Replay

Final

References

2008-09
2008–09 domestic association football cups
Cup